Wilbert "J. R." Miner (sometimes known as Junior Miner) (April 4, 1926 - August 21, 1990) at Moundsville, West Virginia) was a former coach and manager in North American minor league baseball.

Miner attended Bethany College in West Virginia. A third baseman in amateur baseball, he never played professionally. He threw and batted right-handed, stood 5'11" (1.8 m) tall and weighed 185 pounds (84 kg).

His professional coaching career began in the New York Mets organization, where he served as a coach with minor league clubs from 1970–73. After spending 1974 coaching in the farm system of the New York Yankees, he joined the Baltimore Orioles as a coach with their Miami Orioles and Charlotte O's farm clubs (1975–76), then as manager of the Bluefield Orioles of the Rookie-level Appalachian League (1977–79). He then spent eight seasons with the Montreal Expos farm system, as a coach with the West Palm Beach Expos (1980) and then as manager of the team's Calgary Expos, Gastonia Expos, West Palm Beach Expos and Burlington Expos farm clubs (1981–87). His teams won 547 of 1,112 games (.492) with one championship (1983, in the South Atlantic League).

References
 Howe News Bureau, Montreal Expos 1985 Organization Book. St. Petersburg, Florida: The Baseball Library, 1985.
 Johnson, Lloyd, and Wolff, Miles, eds., The Minor League Encyclopedia, 3rd edition. Durham, North Carolina: Baseball America, 2007.

1926 births
1990 deaths
People from Moundsville, West Virginia
Minor league baseball managers
Bethany College (West Virginia) alumni